Pirusaccus is a genus of parasitic barnacles in the family Pirusaccidae, the sole genus of the family. There is one described species in Pirusaccus, P. socialis.

References

Barnacles